Robert Hood Saunders, CBE, QC (May 30, 1903 – January 16, 1955) was mayor of Toronto from 1945 to 1948, President of the Canadian National Exhibition, chairman of the Ontario Hydro (formally named the Hydro Electric Power Commission of Ontario (HEPCO)). He was also a member of the Orange Order in Canada.

Biography

As mayor, he was nicknamed "Grassroots Bob," for his down-to-earth style. A native of Toronto, he was a champion of the Toronto subway and fought to remove slums.  In 1946, Saunders was inspired by an elementary school traffic safety program in Detroit. Saunders worked to start a program in Toronto, and the result was the Elmer the Safety Elephant program.

Saunders was elected alderman for Ward 4 in 1935 and again in 1936. He was defeated in several attempts to be elected to the Toronto Board of Control before returning to city council as an alderman for Ward 4 in 1940. Saunders was elected to and served on the Board of Control from 1941 until 1944 before winning the January 1, 1945 mayoral election by defeating incumbent mayor Frederick J. Conboy. Saunders was re-elected in 1946, 1947 and 1948.

After his resignation as mayor, he became chairman of the Ontario Hydro commission in February 1948. One of his mandates was developing Ontario's waterpower resources, especially on the St. Lawrence Seaway. On January 14, 1955 he boarded an airplane on a business trip. The plane left Windsor, Ontario and on approach to London, Ontario, the plane crashed. The 51-year-old Saunders died as a result of the injuries he sustained. He is buried in Mount Pleasant Cemetery, Toronto (section Q-207).

On his death, Fred Gardiner, chairman of Metropolitan Toronto Council, had this to say:
Newsboy, athlete, successful lawyer, mayor to the city, chairman of Hydro, president of the Exhibition, and the one man most responsible for the St. Lawrence Seaway, Bob Saunder's life was a series of successes which only a man of his dynamic energy and ability could accomplish.

A tribute to Saunders was unveiled by the then Premier Leslie M. Frost of Ontario on September 5, 1958. A St. Lawrence Power Project, the R.H. Saunders – St. Lawrence Station, was named after him.  On this occasion, Premier Frost said, 
... he was a person of kindness and understanding; a very human being in many capacities and in many ways. His accomplishments were legion ... It is a fitting tribute to his memory that the St. Lawrence Power Project be named after him.

Robert H Saunders Memorial

In Toronto the Robert H. Saunders Memorial, a bas relief on stone marker was completed in 1957 by Emanuel Hahn on University Avenue south of College Street.

See also

List of Toronto municipal elections

References

Toronto Telegram, January 17, 1955

External links
RH Saunder Power Station
Elmer the Safety Elephant
Video clip of Elmer the Safety Elephant

1903 births
1955 deaths
Canadian Commanders of the Order of the British Empire
Canadian King's Counsel
Mayors of Toronto
Victims of aviation accidents or incidents in Canada
Ontario Hydro